Yalkut Yosef ("Collation of Yosef") is an authoritative, contemporary work of Halakha, providing a detailed explanation of the Shulchan Aruch as based on the halachic rulings of the former Rishon LeTzion Rav Ovadia Yosef.  It was written by Rabbi Yitzhak Yosef, his son.

Yalkut Yosef is written to give practical halachic guidance to Jews of Sephardi and Mizrahi origin; it is widely cited, and a growing number of synagogues and yeshivot are using the work for study purposes.

The work is published in 24 volumes and includes a 2 volume "kitzur" (summary). It currently covers almost all of the Orach Chayim section of the Shulchan Aruch, and parts of Yoreh De'ah dealing with Kashrut.

A new English edition, "The Saka Edition-Yalkut Yosef",  is currently being published under the leadership of Rabbi Yisrael Bitan of Haketer Institute of Jerusalem.  As of September 2018, 30 volumes have been published and additional volumes are under preparation. Haketer Institute plans on publishing 33 volumes which will cover all areas of Sephardi Halacha observance.

See also
Ben Ish Chai, by Rabbi Yosef Hayyim, a Sephardi work of Halakha incorporating Kabbalistic teachings.
Kaf HaChaim - a discursive Sephardi work of Halakha by Rabbi Yaakov Chaim Sofer.

References and External links
Notes

Links
 Yalkut Yosef Kitzur Shulchan Aruch online 
 http://www.yalkutyosef.co.il/ 
 Kitzur Shulchan Aruch Yalkut Yosef set online for Android 

Shas
Ovadia Yosef
Rabbinic legal texts and responsa
Sifrei Kodesh